Fred Staten (1937 – December 1998) was a New Orleans nightclub performer commonly known as the Chicken Man, although he styled himself Prince Keeyama and a voodoo priest.

Biography
Staten was born in Haiti in 1937 and later moved to New Orleans where he established a voodoo temple. He became known as the Chicken Man for infamously biting off the heads of live chicken while performing his voodoo rituals. He was taught by his Haitian grandparents the voodoo arts.

References

External links 
 A biography of Fred Staten
 Discussion of an article on Chicken Man
 A review of The Chicken Man, a musical biography of Fred Staten 

1937 births
1998 deaths
American entertainers
American occultists
Haitian emigrants to the United States
American Voodoo practitioners
Louisiana Creole people
Louisiana Voodoo
People from New Orleans
Religious leaders from Louisiana